Enne may refer to:
Enne Dam, a dam in Kütahya Province, Turkey
Canton of Enne et Alzou, an administrative division of Aveyron, France
Enne Limited, a data company founded by Antonino Letteriello

People with the surname
Merika Enne (born 1992), Finnish snowboarder

See also
Ennes (disambiguation)
Ñ, a letter used in Spanish and other languages